Galineh-ye Bozorg (also Romanized as Galīneh-ye Bozorg; also known as Galīneh-ye ‘Olyā) is a village in Baryaji Rural District, in the Central District of Sardasht County, West Azerbaijan Province, Iran. At the 2006 census, its population was 68, in 14 families.

References 

Populated places in Sardasht County